Karl Schirra (16 October 1928 – 12 September 2010) was a German footballer who played for Borussia Neunkirchen, 1. FC Saarbrücken and the Saarland national team as a forward.

References

1928 births
2010 deaths
German footballers
Saar footballers
Saarland international footballers
Saarland B international footballers
Borussia Neunkirchen players
1. FC Saarbrücken players
Association football forwards